Greenwood Clean Energy, Inc. is a privately held company located in Redmond, Washington that manufactures wood and biomass central heating systems. In 2009, a team of entrepreneurs and industry veterans developed and distributed woody-biomass-fueled heating appliances for home and light commercial use. In 2010, The Clean Energy Company, LLC (CEC) acquired the 'Greenwood' brand, certain assets and intellectual property of Greenwood Technologies. CEC then assumed the Greenwood name and became Greenwood Clean Energy, Inc. and began marketing its appliances under the 'Greenwood' brand. Greenwood Technologies, LLC ceased operations in February 2009.  In 2012, Greenwood launched the Frontier Series indoor wood boiler, a 3rd generation wood gasification system.

Emissions 
Greenwood is an advocate for responsible wood-burning and has been participating with the U.S. Environmental Protection Agency and numerous state air quality agencies to encourage the use of more efficient wood boilers instead of the older models. As an example, Greenwood Clean Energy's Frontier CX heating appliance meets the requirements for efficiency and emissions outlined in the Washington State Department of Ecology standards of less than 4.5 grams of particulate matter per hour using the Douglas Fir test fuel. [1]

Industry Recognition 
Greenwood has received numerous awards from various organizations, publications, and expos, including:

 2008 Reader's Choice Award - CONTRACTOR Magazine; [3]

Plumbing & Mechanical Magazine;
2007 Brilliant Innovation Award - Discover Brilliant International Conference;
2007 AHR Expo Innovation Award - AHR Expo;
2006 Vesta Award: Groundbreaking Advancement in Renewable Fuel Heating - Hearth and Home;

References

Boilers
Companies based in Redmond, Washington
Residential heating
Heaters